The 2019–20 Brisbane Heat Women's season was the fifth in the team's history. Coached by Ashley Noffke and captained by Kirby Short, the Heat finished first on the WBBL05 ladder. They proceeded to defeat the Adelaide Strikers in the final at Allan Border Field by six wickets, successfully defending their WBBL04 title to claim a second consecutive championship. Keeper-batter Beth Mooney again earned Player of the Final honours, while Jess Jonassen won the Heat's Most Valuable Player award.

Squad 
Each 2019–20 squad featured 15 players, with an allowance of up to five marquee signings including a maximum of three from overseas. Australian marquees are players who held a national women's team contract at the beginning of the WBBL|05 signing period.

The Heat made several personnel changes in the lead-up to the season:

 Ashley Noffke replaced Peter McGiffin as head coach.
 Josie Dooley signed with the Melbourne Renegades to establish herself as a wicket-keeper—a role already occupied at Brisbane by Beth Mooney.
 Jemma Barsby opted to "pursue a fresh challenge" with a move to the Perth Scorchers.
 Vacant roster spots were subsequently allocated to young Queensland locals Charli Knott and Lilly Mills.
 South African duo Laura Wolvaardt and Suné Luus were not re-signed for WBBL|05.
 Overseas marquee positions were filled by New Zealanders Maddy Green and Amelia Kerr.

The table below lists the Heat players and their key stats (including runs scored, batting strike rate, wickets taken, economy rate, catches and stumpings) for the season.

Ladder

Fixtures 
All times are local time

Regular season

Knockout phase

Statistics and awards 

 Most runs: Beth Mooney – 743 (2nd in the league)
 Highest score in an innings: Beth Mooney – 86 (57) vs Melbourne Renegades, 27 November
 Most wickets: Jess Jonassen – 21 (2nd in the league)
 Best bowling figures in an innings: Jess Jonassen – 4/13 (4 overs) vs Sydney Thunder, 16 November
 Most catches: Mikayla Hinkley – 7 (equal 9th in the league)
 Player of the Match awards:
 Jess Jonassen – 5
 Beth Mooney – 3
 Amelia Kerr – 2
 Laura Harris – 1
 Heat Most Valuable Player: Jess Jonassen
 WBBL|05 Player of the Tournament: Beth Mooney (2nd), Jess Jonassen (5th)
 WBBL|05 Team of the Tournament: Jess Jonassen, Beth Mooney, Ashley Noffke (coach)
 Player of the Final: Beth Mooney

References 

2019–20 Women's Big Bash League season by team
Brisbane Heat (WBBL)